Warren Township is a township in Somerset County, New Jersey, United States. The township is a bedroom suburb of New York City in the much larger New York metropolitan area, located within the Raritan Valley region. As of the 2020 United States census, the township's population was 15,923, an increase of 612 (+4.0%) from the 2010 census count of 15,311, which in turn reflected an increase of 1,052 (+7.4%) from the 14,259 counted in the 2000 census. Warren is situated in northeastern Somerset County bordering both Morris (along the Passaic River) and Union counties.

The township has been one of the state's highest-income communities. Based on data from the American Community Survey for 2013–2017, Warren Township residents had a median household income of $154,647, ranked 12th in the state among municipalities with more than 10,000 residents, more than double the statewide median of $76,475.

History
Warren was originally inhabited by the Lenape Native Americans and was colonized in the 1720s by European farmers. As early as 1900, it became a destination for wealthy residents looking to escape nearby New York City. Warren was incorporated as a township by an act of the New Jersey Legislature on March 5, 1806, from portions of Bernards Township and Bridgewater Township. The south-eastern half of the original township (which was close to a railroad and contained most of the population) was separated off as North Plainfield Township (since renamed to Green Brook Township) on April 2, 1872.

Warren was named for Revolutionary War patriot, General Joseph Warren, who was killed at the Battle of Bunker Hill. Warren celebrated its 200th anniversary in 2006.

On January 15, 2021, Kings Food Market announced they would close their Warren location on Mountain Boulevard. The store closed on January 23, 2021.

Geography
According to the United States Census Bureau, the township had a total area of 19.64 square miles (50.86 km2), including 19.57 square miles (50.68 km2) of land and 0.07 square miles (0.18 km2) of water (0.36%).

Unincorporated communities, localities and place names located partially or completely within the township include Coontown, Dock Watch Hollow, Gallia, Mount Bethel, Round Top, Smalleytown, Springdale, Union Village, and Warrenville.

The township borders Bernards Township to the north and west, Bridgewater Township to the southwest, Green Brook Township to the southeast, and Watchung to the east; all of which lie within Somerset County. Northeastern borders are the communities of Long Hill in Morris County and Berkeley Heights in Union County.

The east–west Second Watchung Mountain ridge bisects Warren, with the northern half of the township sloping northward to the Passaic River and Dead River, and the southern half spanning the Washington Valley, between the First and Second Watchung Mountain ridges, through which runs the East Branch of the Middle Brook.

Demographics

2010 census

The Census Bureau's 2006–2010 American Community Survey showed that (in 2010 inflation-adjusted dollars) median household income was $135,143 (with a margin of error of +/− $23,156) and the median family income was $162,083 (+/− $17,221). Males had a median income of $115,875 (+/− $15,861) versus $68,450 (+/− $13,300) for females. The per capita income for the township was $71,469 (+/− $6,664). About 0.8% of families and 0.9% of the population were below the poverty line, including 0.8% of those under age 18 and none of those age 65 or over.

2000 census
As of the 2000 United States census there were 14,259 people, 4,629 households, and 3,939 families residing in the township.  The population density was 725.0 people per square mile (279.9/km2).  There were 4,718 housing units at an average density of 239.9 per square mile (92.6/km2).  The racial makeup of the township was 86.28% White, 1.26% African American, 0.04% Native American, 10.67% Asian, 0.06% Pacific Islander, 0.41% from other races, and 1.28% from two or more races. Hispanic or Latino of any race were 3.19% of the population.

There were 4,629 households, out of which 45.3% had children under the age of 18 living with them, 78.3% were married couples living together, 4.8% had a female householder with no husband present, and 14.9% were non-families. 12.2% of all households were made up of individuals, and 5.0% had someone living alone who was 65 years of age or older.  The average household size was 3.05 and the average family size was 3.33.

In the township the population was spread out, with 29.7% under the age of 18, 4.6% from 18 to 24, 27.5% from 25 to 44, 27.0% from 45 to 64, and 11.2% who were 65 years of age or older.  The median age was 39 years. For every 100 females, there were 99.1 males.  For every 100 females age 18 and over, there were 95.6 males.

The median income for a household in the township was $103,677, and the median income for a family was $121,264. Males had a median income of $80,231 versus $46,356 for females. The per capita income for the township was $49,475.  About 0.7% of families and 2.1% of the population were below the poverty line, including 1.4% of those under age 18 and 1.5% of those age 65 or over.

Economy
The insurance company Chubb is based in Warren.

Arts and culture
Until 2017, the Serbian Orthodox Eparchy of Eastern America was headquartered in Warren Township.

Parks and recreation

Government

Local government 
Warren Township is governed under the Township form of New Jersey municipal government, one of 141 municipalities (of the 564) statewide that use this form, the second-most commonly used form of government in the state. The Township Committee is comprised of five members, who are elected directly by the voters at-large in partisan elections to serve three-year terms of office on a staggered basis, with either one or two seats coming up for election each year as part of the November general election in a three-year cycle. At an annual reorganization meeting held in the first week of January, the Township Committee selects one of its members to serve as Mayor. Township Committee meetings are held at the municipal building on Thursdays.

, Township Committee members are Mayor Victor J. Sordillo (R, term on committee ends December 31, 2024; term as mayor ends 2022), Deputy Mayor Gary P. DiNardo (R, term on committee ends 2024; term as deputy mayor ends 2022), George K. Lazo (R, 2023), Jolanta Maziarz (R, 2022) and Michael C. "Mick" Marion (R, 2023).

Former Township Committee member Frank Salvato, re-elected in 2008, served until his death in 2011 at the age of 98, having been first elected to the Committee in the 1938 and served as mayor in 1939, the township's youngest.

In 1975, the Township Committee created the position of Township Administrator, to serve a one-year term beginning in July of each year. The Township Administrator is Mark M. Krane, who has served in that post since 1986.

The Historical Sites Committee was formed in 1971 and members are appointed by the governing body to administer municipally owned historic landmarks. The historical landmarks they have protected are the Mount Bethel Baptist Meetinghouse, the Kirch–Ford House, and two small family cemeteries. The Meetinghouse and the Kirch–Ford House are listed on the National Register of Historic Places.

Federal, state and county representation 
Warren Township is located in the 7th Congressional District and is part of New Jersey's 21st state legislative district.

 

Somerset County is governed by a five-member Board of County Commissioners, whose members are elected at-large to three-year terms of office on a staggered basis, with one or two seats coming up for election each year. At an annual reorganization meeting held on the first Friday of January, the board selects a Director and Deputy Director from among its members. , Somerset County's County Commissioners are
Director Shanel Robinson (D, Franklin Township, term as commissioner ends December 31, 2024; term as director ends 2022),
Deputy Director Melonie Marano (D, Green Brook Township, term as commissioner and as deputy director ends 2022),
Paul Drake (D, Hillsborough Township, 2023),
Douglas Singleterry (D, North Plainfield, 2023) and 
Sara Sooy (D, Basking Ridge in Bernards Township, 2024).
Pursuant to Article VII Section II of the New Jersey State Constitution, each county in New Jersey is required to have three elected administrative officials known as constitutional officers. These officers are the County Clerk and County Surrogate (both elected for five-year terms of office) and the County Sheriff (elected for a three-year term). Constitutional officers, elected on a countywide basis are 
County Clerk Steve Peter (D, Somerville, 2022),
Sheriff Darrin Russo (D, Franklin Township, 2022) and 
Surrogate Bernice "Tina" Jalloh (D, Franklin Township, 2025)

Politics
As of March 23, 2011, there were a total of 10,466 registered voters in Warren Township, of which 1,875 (17.9% vs. 26.0% countywide) were registered as Democrats, 3,484 (33.3% vs. 25.7%) were registered as Republicans and 5,102 (48.7% vs. 48.2%) were registered as Unaffiliated. There were 5 voters registered as Libertarians or Greens. Among the township's 2010 Census population, 68.4% (vs. 60.4% in Somerset County) were registered to vote, including 94.7% of those ages 18 and over (vs. 80.4% countywide).

In the 2016 presidential election, Republican Donald Trump received 53.1% of the vote (4,483 cast), ahead of Democrat Hillary Clinton with 43.3% (3,656 votes), and other candidates received 3.6% (305 votes). A total of 8,444 ballots were cast. In the 2012 presidential election, Republican Mitt Romney received 63.0% of the vote (4,605 cast), ahead of Democrat Barack Obama with 36.1% (2,636 votes), and other candidates with 1.0% (70 votes), among the 7,351 ballots cast by the township's 11,286 registered voters (40 ballots were spoiled), for a turnout of 65.1%. In the 2008 presidential election, Republican John McCain received 4,813 votes (58.5% vs. 46.1% countywide), ahead of Democrat Barack Obama with 3,259 votes (39.6% vs. 52.1%) and other candidates with 88 votes (1.1% vs. 1.1%), among the 8,222 ballots cast by the township's 10,367 registered voters, for a turnout of 79.3% (vs. 78.7% in Somerset County). In the 2004 presidential election, Republican George W. Bush received 4,761 votes (60.5% vs. 51.5% countywide), ahead of Democrat John Kerry with 2,988 votes (38.0% vs. 47.2%) and other candidates with 65 votes (0.8% vs. 0.9%), among the 7,866 ballots cast by the township's 9,375 registered voters, for a turnout of 83.9% (vs. 81.7% in the whole county).

In the 2013 gubernatorial election, Republican Chris Christie received 77.8% of the vote (3,421 cast), ahead of Democrat Barbara Buono with 20.5% (899 votes), and other candidates with 1.7% (75 votes), among the 4,444 ballots cast by the township's 11,430 registered voters (49 ballots were spoiled), for a turnout of 38.9%. In the 2009 gubernatorial election, Republican Chris Christie received 3,782 votes (67.2% vs. 55.8% countywide), ahead of Democrat Jon Corzine with 1,355 votes (24.1% vs. 34.1%), Independent Chris Daggett with 433 votes (7.7% vs. 8.7%) and other candidates with 30 votes (0.5% vs. 0.7%), among the 5,632 ballots cast by the township's 10,420 registered voters, yielding a 54.0% turnout (vs. 52.5% in the county).

Education 
The Warren Township Schools serve public school students in pre-kindergarten through eighth grade. As of the 2020–21 school year, the district, comprised of five schools, had an enrollment of 1,525 students and 188.3 classroom teachers (on an FTE basis), for a student–teacher ratio of 8.1:1. Schools in the district (with 2020–21 enrollment data from the National Center for Education Statistics.) are 
Central School with 293 students in grades K-5, 
Mt. Horeb School with 202 students in grades PreK-5, 
Angelo L. Tomaso School with 248 students in grades K-5, 
Woodland School with 229 students in grades K-5 and 
Warren Middle School with 544 students in grades 6-8.

Students in public school for ninth through twelfth grades attend Watchung Hills Regional High School, which serves students from Warren as well as the neighboring communities of Watchung, Green Brook (in Somerset County) and Long Hill Township (in Morris County). As of the 2020–21 school year, the high school had an enrollment of 1,909 students and 157.6 classroom teachers (on an FTE basis), for a student–teacher ratio of 12.1:1. The district's board of education has nine members, who are elected directly by the voters to serve three-year terms of office on a staggered basis, with three seats up for each year. Of the nine elected seats, four are allocated to Warren Township.

Transportation

Other significant roads which pass through the township include County Route 525, County Route 527 and County Route 531.

Notable people

People who were born in, residents of, or otherwise closely associated with Warren Township include:

 Michael Arrom, musician and keyboardist for Steve Vai
 Scott Braun, studio host and reporter for MLB Network and NHL Network
 Joe Cerisano, singer, songwriter, record producer
 Austen Crehore (1893–1962), World War I pilot in the Armée de l'Air and the recipient of the Legion of Honor and Croix de Guerre with two palms
 Monica Crowley (born 1968), conservative radio and TV talk show personality
 Donald DiFrancesco (born 1944), former N.J. Senate president and Acting Governor
 Daniel Edelman (born 2003), professional soccer player who plays as a midfielder for New York Red Bulls II
 Mike Ferguson (born 1970), former U.S. Congressman
 James L. Flanagan (1925–2015), electrical engineer
 Bob Franks (1951–2010), former N.J. legislative leader and U.S. Congressman
 Emma Fursch-Madi (1847–1894), French operatic soprano
 Gloria Gaynor (born 1949), singer, known for "I Will Survive"
 Chris Kratt (born 1969), host of Kratts' Creatures and Zoboomafoo as well as Be the Creature, which runs on the National Geographic Channel
 Martin Kratt (born 1965), brother of Chris, and also an educational nature show host
 James Morris (born 1947), opera singer
 Amber Skye Noyes (born 1987), actress and singer, known for her portrayal of Tori Windsor in The CW series Beauty & the Beast and Celine Fox in the ABC thriller Quantico
 Calvin Pace (born 1980), outside linebacker for the New York Jets
 David Palmer, vocalist and songwriter, best known as a former member of Steely Dan and as the lyricist of the Carole King number two hit, "Jazzman"
 Allison Reed (born 1994), ice dancer who competes with Vasili Rogov for Israel
 Cathy Reed (born 1987), American-born Japanese ice dancer, who has competed with her brother Chris as her partner
 Chris Reed (born 1989), American-born Japanese ice dancer, who has competed with his sister Cathy as his partner.
 Adam Riess (born 1969), Nobel Prize winner in Physics, 2011
 Dan Schulman (born 1958), President and CEO of PayPal, Chairman of Symantec
 Ravi Shankar (1920–2012), musician and composer best known for his work on the sitar
 J. R. Smith (born 1985), NBA player for the Cleveland Cavaliers
 Steven H. Temares (born 1958), CEO of Bed Bath & Beyond
 Jeffrey Vanderbeek, former owner of the New Jersey Devils
 Lily Yip (born 1963), Olympic table tennis player and coach

Points of interest 

 Mount Bethel Baptist Meetinghouse
 Kirch–Ford House
 Torino's (traditionally: the King George Inn),  The building was knocked down in 2019.
 Springdale United Methodist Church, 
 Mount Horeb United Methodist Church, 1867
 Hofheimer Mausoleum (sometimes colloquially referred to as the "Tomb of the 12 Nuns")

References

External links

Warren Township official website

 
1806 establishments in New Jersey
Populated places established in 1806
Township form of New Jersey government
Townships in Somerset County, New Jersey